Searsport may refer to a location in the United States:

 Searsport, Maine, a town
 Searsport (CDP), Maine, census-designated place comprising the center of the town